Germain Pirlot (born 18 March 1943 in Sart-Custinne, Gedinne, Belgium) is a Belgian esperantist and ex-teacher of French and history, presently living in Ostend. He is best known as the inventor of the name euro for the common currency of the European Union (EU).

On 4 August 1995, Pirlot sent a letter to then President of the European Commission, Jacques Santer, in which he suggested the name euro to be used for the planned currency of the EU. Later, Pirlot received an official letter thanking him for the suggestion.

The name euro was officially adopted by the European Council in Madrid (Spain) on 16 December 1995. Jean-Jacques Schul, chairman of Promeuro (Association for the promotion of the euro), claims that to his knowledge nobody else had suggested to use this name for the currency before 4 August 1995.

Another suggestion made by Pirlot in the same letter, to name the hundredth of the currency "ropas", has not been realized – instead, the name "cent" has been adopted.

Sources 

1943 births
Living people
People from Namur (province)
Euro